The Olojo Festival is an ancient festival celebrated annually in Ife, Osun State, Nigeria. It is one of the popular festivals in the Yoruba land, and was once described by Oba Adeyeye Enitan Ogunwusi as a festival that celebrates the Black race all over the world. The Yoruba word 'Olojo' means 'The Day Of The First Dawn' that describes the grateful heart of man towards God's creation and the existence of Human.  The Olojo Festival is a culture festival in the calendar of the Ile-Ife, Osun State which is located in the Southwestern part of Nigeria. It is the celebration of the remembrance of “Ogun”, god of Iron, who is believed to be the first son of Oduduwa, progenitor of the Yoruba people. The festival is held annually in October. It is one of the biggest festival on the culture calendar of lle-Ife.

Ritual
On this day, the Ooni (king of Ife) appears after seven days of seclusion and denial, communing with the ancestors and praying for his people. This is to make him pure and ensure the efficacy of his prayers. Before the Ooni emerges, women from his maternal and paternal families sweep the Palace, symbolically ridding the Palace of evil.

The Ooni later appears in public with the Are crown (King’s Crown), which is believed to be the original crown used by Oduduwa to lead a procession of traditional Chiefs and Priests to perform at the Shrine of Ogun.
The next stage of the ceremony is to lead the crowd to Okemogun’s shrine. Here he performs duties including the renewal of oath, divination for the Ooni at the foot of Oketage hill by Araba (Chief Priest), as well as visiting places of historical importance.

At the shrine, the traditional Chiefs with the swords of office marked with chalk and cam wood, appear in ceremonial attire and dance to rhythms from Bembe, a traditional drum. The style of grum and singing for each Chief is different. Only the Ooni can dance to the drum called Osirigi.

The Ifa Festival is a seven-day festival that takes place every year on the first Saturday in June. Ifa (also known as Orunmila) is a deity oracle and one of the Yoruba people's most important deities. The first day of the festival includes rituals such as Ijawe Ifa Ooni (leaf picking for Ooni's oracle) and Arisun Idana Afin (a culinary vigil at the palace), while the second day is dedicated to Bibo Ifa Ooni (sacrifice for Ooni's oracle). The third and fourth days are dedicated to Awo Oloju merindinlogun performing rites (a cult with sixteen faces). A public lecture and roundtable discussion on 'women in Ifa,' as well as a performance of rituals by a priest named Araba Agbaye, took place on the fifth day. The great climax, which begins on Saturday and lasts until early the next day, includes iwure (blessings/prayer) by Araba Agbaye (backbone of the universe) and other Arabas, as well as the feeding of Ifa and the crafting of the year's divination.

Olojo has remained popular in Ile-Ife because of its myth and history. It connotes the day in the year specially blessed by Olodumare (the creator of the Universe). Olojo can also be literally translated as the "Owner for the day". Prayers are offered for peace and tranquility in Yoruba and Nigeria. All age groups participate. Its significance is the unification of the Yorubas.

Tradition holds that Ile-Ife is the cradle of the Yorubas, the city of survivors, spiritual seat of the Yorubas, and land of the ancients.

References 

 Olubunmi, A.O. The Rise and Fall of The Yoruba Race 10,000BC-1960AD, The 199 Publishing Palace 
 On Ijesa Racial Purity, The 199 Publishing Palace 
 Akinjogbin, I. A. (Hg.): The Cradle of a Race: Ife from the Beginning to 1980, Lagos 1992 (The book also has chapters on the present        religious situation in the town).
 Bascom, William: The Yoruba of Southwestern Nigeria, New York 1969 (The book mainly deals with Ife).

External links
 Olojo Festival Article

Cultural festivals in Nigeria
Yoruba festivals
Ife
Yoruba